, formerly known as GAU Entertainment and , was a Japanese video game developer originally established in 1992. It developed games for other companies on a contract basis. Their clients included Sega, Capcom, Namco, Takara, Taito, Atlus, and Square Enix. Nex Entertainment was founded as GAU Entertainment. Two years later, the company merged into Nextech, which was bought by Sega in 1997. Nex Entertainment emerged as a third-party developer in 2003. NEX Entertainment's major shareholder, Fields <2767> announced on July 29, 2016 that it closed the company.

Games

Arcade
Cobra the Arcade
Time Crisis 3
Time Crisis 4

Dreamcast
Dino Crisis
Dream Studio
Resident Evil – Code: Veronica
Resident Evil – Code: Veronica X
Shenmue
Type X: Spiral Nightmare (canceled)

Game Boy Advance
Shining Soul (co-developed with Grasshopper Manufacture)
Shining Soul II (co-developed with Grasshopper Manufacture)

GameCube
Resident Evil – Code: Veronica X

Mega Drive/Genesis
Crusader of Centy
Pro Striker Final Stage
Ranger X
YuYu Hakusho: Gaiden

Nintendo DS
Children of Mana
Lupin Sansei: Shijou Saidai no Zunousen

Nintendo 3DS
Crimson Shroud
Rental Bukiya de Omasse

PlayStation 2
Dynasty Tactics 2
Lupin III: Columbus no Isan wa Akenisomaru
Lupin III: Lupin ni wa Shi o, Zenigata ni wa Koi o
Resident Evil – Code: Veronica X
Resident Evil Survivor 2 Code: Veronica
Shining Tears
Shining Wind
Shirachuu Tankenbu
Time Crisis 3

PlayStation 3
Bayonetta
Time Crisis 4
Time Crisis: Razing Storm

PlayStation 4
Killing Bites (cancelled)

PlayStation Vita
Killing Bites (cancelled)

Sega Saturn
Battle Arena Toshinden Remix
Battle Arena Toshinden U.R.A
Choro Q Park
Cyber Speedway
D-Xhird
Linkle Liver Story
Pro Yakyuu Greatest Nine '98
Pro Yakyuu Greatest Nine '98 Summer Action
Resident Evil

Windows
Chi Q no Tomodachi
Dark Eyes
Dark Eyes 2000
Dream Studio
You will go out to the Pico-town!

WonderSwan Color
Dark Eyes: BattleGate

Xbox
Shin Megami Tensei: Nine
Touge R

References

External links
  

Defunct video game companies of Japan
Video game companies established in 1992
Video game companies disestablished in 2016
Privately held companies of Japan
Video game development companies
Japanese companies established in 1992
Japanese companies disestablished in 2016